Khoshk Abkhowreh (also Romanized as Khoshk Ābkhowreh; also known as Khoshkeh Ābkhvord) is a village in Khezel-e Gharbi Rural District, in the Central District of Kangavar County, Kermanshah Province, Iran. At the 2006 census, its population was 45, in 9 families.

References 

Populated places in Kangavar County